The Director of Human Resources (PERSDIR) is the director of human resources of the Swedish Armed Forces. PERSDIR, which heads the Human Resources Department (Ledningsstabens personalavdelning, LEDS PERS), is an administrative position based at the Swedish Armed Forces Headquarters in Stockholm. The PERSDIR is part of the Defence Board (Försvarsmaktsledningen, FML), a group of the Supreme Commander's top commanders.

Tasks
The Director of Human Resources shall lead and coordinate the agency's human resources. The task includes leading and coordinating training courses with central admission and deciding on the appointment and placement of executives at level OF-4 (lieutenant colonel and commander) and OF-5 (colonel and captain) and as well as the CF 4 and 5, officers with special competence (OFSK), OR 9, doctoral students and doctoral candidates and OF-3 (major and lieutenant commander) with completed higher officer program part 1 (HOP 1). The Director of Human Resources must support the Supreme Commander of the Swedish Armed Forces and heads directly subordinates to the Supreme Commander in the role of employer representative and with the systematic occupational safety and health work. The task includes gender equality work, social equality work, värdegrund work, psychological defence with the support of the Chief of Armed Forces Training & Procurement, rehabilitation work and health care including physical training. The Director of Human Resources is the Swedish Armed Forces' Chief of Training.

The Director of Human Resources shall prepare documentation for the orientation of human resources in the Armed Forces' Strategic Orientation (Försvarsmaktens Strategiska Inriktning, FMSI) and the Armed Forces' Operational Plan (Försvarsmaktens verksamhetsplan, FMVP). The Director of Human Resources is authorized to represent the Swedish Armed Forces in central employer matters in contact with other government agencies and organizations and to prepare and sign the Armed Forces' collective agreement within the framework of the financial conditions specified by the Chief of Defence Staff. The Director of Human Resources may draw up and propose regulations, internal regulations and general advice for human resources, veterans activities and systematic occupational safety and health work.

The Director of Human Resources decides:
 manuals for human resources, veterans operations and systematic occupational safety and health work after consultation with the Chief of Armed Forces Training & Procurement, as well as with the Chief of Joint Operations or the Director of Military Intelligence and Security if these are concerned,
 admission to and separation from education programs with central admission,
 joint agency requirements regarding selection, admission and training for all personnel, and
 appointment of OF/CF-4 and 5, officers with special competence (OFSK), OR-9, doctoral student and doctoral candidates and OF-3 with completed HOP 1.

In the Swedish Armed Forces' regulations (FFS 2019:3) on basic officer training and rank codes and in the Swedish Armed Forces' regulations (FFS 2019:7) on promotion and appointment, there are additional powers for the Director of Human Resources. The Director of Human Resources is authorized to enter into agreements and contracts with government agencies, municipalities, regions, organizations and individuals.

The Director of Human Resources is the Swedish Armed Forces' Chief of Training. The Swedish Armed Forces' Chief of Training reports to the Chief of Armed Forces Training & Procurement regarding planning, implementation and follow-up of the activities at Military Academy Karlberg/Military Academy Halmstad and the Swedish Armed Forces Human Resources Centre (Försvarsmaktens HR-centrum, FM HRC) as well as the Swedish Armed Forces' training operations.

Directors of Human Resources

Deputy Directors of Human Resources

References

Military appointments of Sweden
Military human resource management